Craig Zisk is an American director and producer.

Biography
Zisk grew up in Dallas, where he graduated from the St. Mark's School of Texas. His family was Jewish. 

After graduating from the University of Southern California, Zisk directed his first television series, Brooklyn Bridge, at the age of 26. His first feature film was The English Teacher, starring Julianne Moore, Greg Kinnear, Nathan Lane, Michael Angarano and Lily Collins.
 
Zisk has executive-produced several series including Weeds, United States of Tara and The Larry Sanders Show. He has also directed over 50 series, including The Big C, Nurse Jackie, Entourage, The Office, Alias, Smash, Parks and Recreation, Shameless, Nip/Tuck, The Exorcist, New Amsterdam and Brave New World.

Zisk has been nominated for several Golden Globe Awards for Weeds. He has also earned multiple Emmy nominations for The Larry Sanders Show and Weeds, including a nomination for Best Director for a Comedy.

His brother Randy Zisk is also a television director.

See also 
Notable alumni of St. Mark's School of Texas

References

External links

American television directors
American television producers
Living people
American Jews
University of Southern California alumni
Place of birth missing (living people)
Year of birth missing (living people)